The 2013–14 Texas Tech Lady Raiders basketball team will represent Texas Tech University in the 2013–14 college basketball season. It will be head coach Candi Whitaker's first season at Texas Tech. The Lady Raiders, are members of the Big 12 Conference and will play their home games at the United Spirit Arena. They finished with the season with a record of 6–24 overall, 0–18 in Big 12 play to finish in last place. They lost in the first round to TCU in the 2014 Big 12 women's basketball tournament.

Rankings

Before the season

Departures

Recruiting
Recruiting information will be posted as soon as it is made available on the Texas Tech website.

2013–14 media

Television & Radio information
Select Lady Raiders games will be shown on FSN affiliates throughout the season, including FSSW, FSSW+, and FCS Atlantic, Central, and Pacific. All games will be broadcast on the Lady Raiders Radio Network on either KLZK or KJTV.

Roster

Schedule

|-
!colspan=12 style="background:#000000; color:#CC0000;"| Exhibition

|-
!colspan=12 style="background:#CC0000; color:black;"| Non-Conference Regular Season

|-
!colspan=12 style="background:#CC0000; color:black;"| Big 12 Regular Season

|-
!colspan=12 style="background:#FFFFFF; color:#CC0000;"| 2014 Big 12 women's basketball tournament

See also
Texas Tech Lady Raiders basketball
2013–14 Texas Tech Red Raiders basketball team

References

Texas Tech Lady Raiders basketball seasons
Texas Tech